Naughty is a Russian erotic drama film directed by Dmitry Suvorov. It stars Alexander Petrov and Anastasiya Reznik. It is scheduled to be theatrically released on February 14, 2023.

Plot 
A student named Elya, whose university is visited by the head of a construction company, Matvey, in order to share plans for building on the site of an ancient forest park. Elya looks very self-confident, which intrigues Matvey, who tries to "buy" her. But, as it turned out, Elya does not need a sponsor, and as a result, Matvey decides to offer her a bet.

Cast 
 Alexander Petrov as Matvey Rysak
 Anastasiya "Asya" Reznik as Elvira "Elya" Tsvetaeva
 Yan Tsapnik as Vladimir
 Semyon Arzumanov as Artyom Delovitov
 Vladislav Vetrov as Yuri
 Anna Churina as Victoria
 Nikita Tarasov as Trofim
 Nelli Nevedina as Olga, Elya's stepmother
 Gleb Kulakov as Vanya, a boy

Production
Filming of the project started in early November 2022. This stage of film production was completed a month later, in early December 2022.

References

External links 
 

2023 films
Erotic drama films
2020s erotic drama films
2020s Russian-language films
Russian drama films